Fernand Ciatti (27 March 1912 in Differdange – 9 October 1989) was a boxer from Luxembourg. Ciatti was member of the Luxembourg Olympic team at the 1936 Summer Olympics in Berlin. He got eliminated in the first round of the flyweight division on points by Danish Kaj Frederiksen.

External links
Association Luxembourgeoise des Olympiens
Fernand Ciatti's profile at Sports Reference.com

1912 births
1989 deaths
People from Differdange
Luxembourgian male boxers
Olympic boxers of Luxembourg
Boxers at the 1936 Summer Olympics
Flyweight boxers